Julien Benneteau was the defending champion but decided not to participate.
Kenny de Schepper won the title, defeating Illya Marchenko 7–6(7–4), 6–2 in the final.

Seeds

Draw

Finals

Top half

Bottom half

References
 Main Draw
 Qualifying Draw

Open de Rennes - Singles
2012 Singles